The Gocheok Sky Dome is a domed baseball stadium located in Gocheok-dong, Seoul, South Korea. It is the home ballpark of KBO club Kiwoom Heroes. The stadium is primarily used for baseball and has a capacity for 16,744 spectators for baseball games. The stadium replaced Dongdaemun Baseball Stadium and opened on 15 September 2015. It also serves as a concert venue, with a capacity for around 25,000 spectators.

In 2017, the Gocheok Dome hosted the first round of the 2017 World Baseball Classic, featuring host nations South Korea, Taiwan, Netherlands, and Israel.

In 2019, Gocheok Dome hosted the opening round of Group C at the 2019 WBSC Premier 12. South Korea, Cuba, Australia and Canada competed in Group C, and a total of six matches were held at Gocheok Dome. The South Korean national team advanced to the super round as the top of the group with three wins in the Group C qualifying round.

In 2020, all KBO League postseason games after the first round were played at Gocheok Dome.

List of entertainment events

See also

 Mokdong Baseball Stadium
 Jamsil Baseball Stadium

References

External links 
 Official website 

Baseball venues in South Korea
Sports venues completed in 2015
Sports venues in Seoul
Music venues in Seoul
Covered stadiums in South Korea
Kiwoom Heroes
2015 establishments in South Korea
World Baseball Classic venues